Lulow Rock is a prominent rock,  high, which is the northernmost exposed rock along the face of the Pecora Escarpment, Pensacola Mountains, Antarctica. It was mapped by the United States Geological Survey from surveys and U.S. Navy air photos, 1956–66, and was named by the Advisory Committee on Antarctic Names for William F. Lulow, a cook at Plateau Station, winter 1966.

References

Rock formations of Queen Elizabeth Land